The culture of Florida is similar to the rest of American Southern culture in its Northern and Central subregions, particularly around the Panhandle, but as a coastal state with multiple metro areas historically characterized by immigration, much of Florida's urban culture has been heavily influenced by immigrant populations, especially Caribbean, Latin American, Jewish, and European.

Modern-day Florida, from the second half of the 20th century through today, has been heavily influenced by the cultures of people moving in from foreign countries and other parts of the United States. The state's close proximity to the ocean influences many aspects of Florida culture and daily life. Being a part of the American South, Florida has also long been influenced by Southern culture. However, the culture in the southern half of Florida does not exhibit as much of the Southern culture that is found in North and Central Florida. The Miami area especially has been culturally influenced by Latin and Caribbean immigration. Characteristics such as a Southern accent still remain in North Florida, Central Florida, and sparsely in South Florida. Florida culture is also influenced by tourism, an important industry in the state.

Cuisine 
Southern Florida has been more influenced by infusions from the various cuisines of the Caribbean, South America, and Europe, compared to Northern Florida. However, the cuisine of the Southern United States is popular throughout the whole state. Florida is most often associated with seafood, key lime pie and Floribbean cuisine. Citrus production is a major industry and citrus fruits are widely consumed. Tropical fruits are grown in South Florida and are widely used in Florida cuisine. Barbecue is especially popular throughout the state, where many barbecue competitions are held annually. The development of Florida cuisine has drawn on the cuisines of the southeastern United States, the Bahamas, Colombia, Spain, Cuba, and the rest of the Caribbean, as well as being influenced by national and worldwide trends. Florida attracts immigrants from places around the world as well, many of whom bring their native cuisine with them.

Economic trends 
Florida's population increases annually more rapidly than that of most states. The main economic driver for Florida is tourism. Hotels, restaurants, leisure activities and other tourism-related activities are economically important. Many people from other states, especially Americans from the Northeast and Midwest, retire in Florida. This helps drive home construction, infrastructure expansion, as well as the banking and financial planning industries. Recreational and commercial fishing have been economically important in Florida for over a century.

Florida is also an important agricultural state, producing large amounts of vegetables, fruits, cattle, and dairy products. Light manufacturing has recently increased in Florida, and a number of companies have moved their headquarters to the state, attracted by lower taxes and less regulations.

Languages 
As of 2005, 74.54 percent of Florida residents age 5 and older spoke English at home as a first language, while 18.65 percent spoke Spanish, and 1.73 percent of the population spoke French Creole (predominantly Haitian Creole). French was spoken by 0.63 percent, followed by German at 0.45 percent, and Portuguese at 0.44 percent of all residents. Also, Italian comprised 0.32 percent, while Tagalog made up 0.30 percent of speakers, Vietnamese was at 0.25 percent and Arabic at 0.23 percent. In all, 25.45 percent of Florida's population age 5 and older spoke a language other than English.

Florida's public education system identifies over 200 first languages other than English spoken in the homes of students. In 1990, the League of United Latin American Citizens (LULAC) won a class action lawsuit against the state Florida Department of Education that required educators to be trained in teaching English for Speakers of Other Languages (ESOL).

Literature

Florida literature is as varied as the state itself. Genres traditionally include fiction, nonfiction, and poetry, and some of it may be considered part of the American regional Southern literature genre. Writers affiliated with the locale of Florida include William Bartram, Elizabeth Bishop, James Branch Cabell, Hart Crane, Stephen Crane, Harry Crews, Nilo Cruz, John Fleming, Ernest Hemingway, Carl Hiaasen, Jay Hopler, Zora Neale Hurston, José Martí, Campbell McGrath, Marjorie Kinnan Rawlings, Wallace Stevens, and Harriet Beecher Stowe.

Music

Florida is the birthplace of Southern Rock.  Bands such as Lynyrd Skynyrd, Molly Hatchet, The Allman Brothers all hailed from Northern Florida. The Outlaws hailed from Tampa Bay. 

Florida is home to several unique music subgenres including Florida breaks and Miami bass.

Since the 90s, Miami has made a name in the world of electhronic, rap, and reggaeton music. Miami Music Week, founded in 2010, is an annual electronic music event that gathers top EDM artists around the world. It is considered an institution in EDM. Some of the notable subgenres that participate at this event are Deep House, Techno, and Techno House.

Religion 
According to the Pew Research Center's Religious Landscape Study, Florida's populations is 70% Christian (the largest sect of which is "Evangelical Protestant"), 6% non-Christian, and 24% "No Religion" or "Nothing in Particular." The latter categories, according to the same study, are rising over time, which is consistent with trends nationwide.

Sports and recreation 

Sports in Florida include professional teams from all major sport leagues, many minor league professional teams, Olympic Games contenders and medalists, collegiate teams in major and small-school conferences and associations, and active amateur teams and individual sports.

The state has teams in each of the major professional sports leagues, including – three National Football League (NFL) teams: the Miami Dolphins, Tampa Bay Buccaneers, and the Jacksonville Jaguars; two Major League Baseball (MLB) teams: the Miami Marlins and the Tampa Bay Rays; two National Basketball Association (NBA) teams: the Miami Heat and the Orlando Magic; and two National Hockey League (NHL) teams: the Florida Panthers and the Tampa Bay Lightning. Additionally, Major League Soccer has two teams, Orlando City SC, and Inter Miami FC.

Florida also has an abundance of outdoor recreational activities. Outdoor activities include hiking, surfing, and hunting. Notable auto-racing tracks include: Daytona International Speedway, Homestead-Miami Speedway, Sebring International Raceway, and Streets of St. Petersburg.

See also
 Demographics of Florida

References

Works cited
 
 

 
Florida